The 1981 Big Ten Conference football season was the 86th season of college football played by the member schools of the Big Ten Conference and was a part of the 1981 NCAA Division I-A football season.

The 1981 Big Ten co-champions were Iowa and Ohio State. In an odd twist of fate, the Hawkeyes and Buckeyes did not play each other, while all other conference teams played a full round-robin. Due to this, Iowa was awarded the Rose Bowl berth since its last appearance was in 1959; by comparison, Ohio State went to Pasadena seven times between 1969 and 1980.

Season overview

Results and team statistics

Key
AP final = Team's rank in the final AP Poll of the 1981 season
AP high = Team's highest rank in the AP Poll throughout the 1981 season
PPG = Average of points scored per game
PAG = Average of points allowed per game

Bowl games
Four Big Ten teams played in bowl games at the end of the 1981 season.

Statistical leaders
The Big Ten's individual statistical leaders include the following:

Passing yards 
1. Tony Eason, Illinois (3,360)
2. Scott Campbell, Purdue (2,686)
3. Art Schlichter, Ohio State (2,551)
4. Mike Hohensee, Minnesota (2,412)
5. Babe Laufenberg, Indiana (1,788)

Rushing yards
1. Butch Woolfolk, Michigan (1,459)
2. Tim Spencer, Ohio State (1,217)
3. Jim Gayle, Ohio State (732)
4. Phil Blatcher, Iowa (708)
5. Steve Smith, Michigan (674)

Receiving yards
1. Chester Cooper, Minnesota (1,012)
2. Steve Bryant, Purdue (971)
3. Anthony Carter, Michigan (952)
4. Gary Williams, Ohio State (941)
5. Oliver Williams, Illinois (760)

Total offense
1. Tony Eason, Illinois (3,331)
2. Scott Campbell, Purdue (2,809)
3. Art Schlichter, Ohio State (2,509)
4. Mike Hohensee, Minnesota (2,437)
5. Steve Smith, Michigan (2,335)

Passing efficiency rating
1. Tony Eason, Illinois (140.0)
2. Scott Campbell, Purdue (138.3)
3. Bryan Clark, Michigan State (128.9)
4. Steve Smith, Michigan (125.7)
5. Art Schlichter, Ohio State (123.8)

Rushing yards per attempt
1. Butch Woolfolk, Michigan (5.8)
2. John Williams, Wisconsin (5.5)
3. Tim Spencer, Ohio State (5.4)
4. Manny Henry, Minnesota (5.2)
5. Chucky Davis, Wisconsin (5.2)

Yards per reception
1. Duane Gunn, Indiana (21.2)
2. Daryl Turner, Michigan State (21.1)
3. Oliver Williams, Illinois (20.0)
4. Mike Martin, Illinois (19.7)
5. Anthony Carter, Michigan (19.0)

Points scored
1. Bob Atha, Ohio State (88)
2. Morten Andersen, Michigan State (73)
3. Steve Smith, Michigan (72)
3. Tim Spencer, Ohio State (72)
5. Steve Bryant, Purdue (66)

All-conference players

All-Americans

The NCAA recognizes four selectors as "official" for the 1980 season.  They are (1) the American Football Coaches Association (AFCA), (2) the Associated Press (AP), (3) the Football Writers Association of America (FWAA), and (4) the United Press International (UPI).

Consensus All-Americans
 Anthony Carter, wide receiver, Michigan (AFCA, AP, FWAA, UPI)
 Ed Muransky, offensive tackle, Michigan (AP, UPI)
 Kurt Becker, offensive guard, Michigan (AFCA, AP)
 Tim Krumrie, middle guard, Wisconsin (AP, UPI)
 Reggie Roby, punter, Iowa (AP, UPI)

1982 NFL Draft
The following Big Ten players were selected in the first six rounds of the draft:

References